Aleksandr Aleksandrovich Kasyanov (17 August 1891 – 13 February 1982) was a Soviet and Russian composer, conductor, pianist and professor. He received the Order of Lenin in 1967, Order of the October Revolution in 1981, and People's Artist of the USSR in 1971.

Works
 Iola «Иола» (1923), 
 Stepan Razin, «Степан Разин» (1939) on the Cossack Stepan Razin revised 1953, 3rd revision 1977 given at the Bolshoi
 Partizantka «Партизанка» (1941)
 Foma Gordeyev «Фома Гордеев» (1946) revised 1966 Kromlyovsky Theatre
 In the Far North «На дальнем Севере» (1947),
 Yermak «Ермак» (1957) on the Cossack Yermak Timofeyevich

References

1891 births
1982 deaths
20th-century composers
20th-century male pianists
20th-century Russian conductors (music)
People from Simbirsk Governorate
Saint Petersburg Conservatory alumni
People's Artists of the RSFSR
People's Artists of the USSR
Recipients of the Order of Lenin
Recipients of the Order of the Red Banner of Labour
Glinka State Prize of the RSFSR winners
Deaf classical musicians
Male opera composers
Russian classical musicians
Russian male composers
Russian male conductors (music)
Russian music educators
Russian opera composers
Russian pianists
Soviet classical musicians
Soviet conductors (music)
Soviet male composers
Soviet music educators
Soviet opera composers
Soviet pianists